German South Korean or South Korean German may refer to:
Germans in South Korea
South Koreans in Germany
Germany–South Korea relations
Multiracial people of German and South Korean descent